is a public university in the city of Aomori, Aomori Prefecture Japan. The school was established in 1999. The school is a Facility of Health Sciences, with departments of nursing, physical therapy and social welfare.

References

External links
 Official website 

Educational institutions established in 1999
Public universities in Japan
Universities and colleges in Aomori Prefecture
Nursing schools in Japan
1999 establishments in Japan
Aomori (city)